Cape Williams is an ice-covered cape in Antarctica. It is the termination of Buell Peninsula at the east side of the terminus of Lillie Glacier at the lower ends of George Glacier and Zykov Glacier. The peninsula is 15 nautical miles (28 km) long and is situated at the extremity of the Pennell Coast portion of Victoria Land, lying between Cape Williams and Cape Adare.  It was discovered in February 1911 when the Terra Nova of the British Antarctic Expedition, 1910–13, explored the area westward of Cape North, and it was named for William Williams, Chief Engine-room Artificer on the Terra Nova.

Headlands of Victoria Land
Pennell Coast